The Baldwin DS-4-4-1000 were two models of four-axle  diesel-electric switching locomotives built by the Baldwin Locomotive Works between 1946 and 1951. The first models (56 locomotives) were powered by an 8-cylinder normally aspirated prime mover, but from 1948, a change was made to the second model powered by a 6-cylinder turbocharged engine. These two models replaced the VO-1000 in Baldwin's catalogue, and were in turn replaced by the  S-12 in 1951.

Original owners

608NA engine

606SC engine

References

External links 
 Baldwin DS-4-4-1000 roster
 Preserved Baldwin and Lima locomotives
 DS-4-4-1000 — Original owners

DS-4-4-1000
CLC locomotives
B-B locomotives
Railway locomotives introduced in 1946
Railway locomotives introduced in 1951
Standard gauge locomotives of Canada
Standard gauge locomotives of the United States
Shunting locomotives